Lieder is a German language habitational surname for someone from Liedern. Notable people with the name include:
 Bernard Lieder (1923–2020), American politician
 Clarence Lieder (1906–1969), mechanic and armorer for Chicago's underworld and Depression-era criminals
 Mart Lieder (1990), Dutch professional footballer
 Rico Lieder (1971), retired German sprinter

German-language surnames
German toponymic surnames